The Residences of the World Trade Centre is a postmodern complex near the Harbourfront in Toronto, Ontario, Canada. Built in 1990, the taller of two buildings rises to 37 floors in height. The Residences of the World Trade Centre is a 700-unit condominium complex.

External links
Residences of the World Trade Centre Website

Urbandb Page
Google Sketchup by Wyliepoon

Postmodern architecture in Canada
Skyscrapers in Toronto
Toronto
Harbourfront, Toronto
Residential buildings completed in 1990